Daniel Thomas Kelly (born 31 October 1977 in Melbourne, Australia) is an Australian former judoka and mixed martial artist. Known for his unconventional style, the four-time judo Olympian formerly competed in the middleweight division of the Ultimate Fighting Championship (UFC) between 2014 and 2018.

Background and judo career
Kelly began competing in judo when he was 7 and competed at his first Australian Championships when he was 13. He made the junior national team in 1994 where he competed at the Junior World Championships and went on to make the senior national team two years later.  Kelly has been Australian Champion on nine occasions.

Kelly is the only Judo competitor to have been selected to fight for Australia in four different Olympic games.  He most recently competed at the 2012 Summer Olympics in the -100 kg event.

He was the Judo coach for the Australian team at the 2016 Rio Olympics and the 2020 Japan Olympics.

Mixed martial arts career

Early career
Kelly made his professional MMA debut in July 2006.  He remained out of competition for the next six and a half years due to judo commitments.

Australian Fighting Championship and local MMA
Kelly returned to the sport in December 2012.  Over the next eight months, he improved his record to 5 wins with no losses. Kelly again returned to action in the Australian Fighting Championship (AFC) in May 2014, at AFC 9, defeating Ben Kelleher via second round submission. Kelly was twice slated to fight Steven Kennedy for the vacant AFC middleweight belt in 2013 at AFC 7 and 2014 at AFC 10, but was forced to withdraw due to The Ultimate Fighter Nations: Canada vs. Australia commitments in 2013 and due to injury in 2014.

The Ultimate Fighter
In December 2013, it was announced that Kelly was selected as one of the fighters to represent Australia for the upcoming The Ultimate Fighter Nations: Canada vs. Australia. Kelly was defeated by eventual middleweight runner-up Sheldon Westcott via first round submission.

Ultimate Fighting Championship

2014 
Kelly made his UFC debut against Luke Zachrich on 8 November 2014 at UFC Fight Night 55. Kelly was victorious, winning by submission due to a kimura.

In his second bout for the promotion, Kelly faced Patrick Walsh on 14 February 2015 at UFC Fight Night 60. He won the fight by unanimous decision.

2015 
Kelly faced Sam Alvey on 10 May 2015 at UFC Fight Night 65. He lost the fight via TKO in the first round.

Kelly was expected to face Ricardo Abreu on 15 November 2015 at UFC 193. However, Abreu pulled out of the fight in late September and was replaced by Steve Montgomery.  Kelly won the fight by unanimous decision.

2016 
Kelly faced Antônio Carlos Júnior on 20 March 2016 at UFC Fight Night 85. Kelly won the bout via TKO in the third round.

Kelly next faced Chris Camozzi on 27 November 2016 at UFC Fight Night 101. He won the fight via unanimous decision.

2017 
Kelly faced Rashad Evans on 4 March 2017 at UFC 209. He won the back-and-forth fight by split decision.

Kelly faced Derek Brunson on 11 June 2017 at UFC Fight Night 110. He lost the fight via knockout in the first round.

Kelly faced Elias Theodorou on 19 November 2017 at UFC Fight Night: Werdum vs. Tybura. He lost the fight via unanimous decision.

2018 
Kelly faced Tom Breese on 27 May 2018 at UFC Fight Night 130.  He lost the fight via technical knock out in round one. Kelly became a free agent after the fight.

Championships and accomplishments

Judo
Olympic Games
2000 Summer Olympics - Judo, 9th place (U/81 kg)
2004 Summer Olympics - Judo, 7th place (U/90 kg)
2008 Summer Olympics - Judo, 21st place (U/90 kg)
 2012 Summer Olympics - Judo, 17th place (U/100 kg)

Mixed martial arts record

|-
|Loss
|align=center|13–4
|Tom Breese
|TKO (punches)
|UFC Fight Night: Thompson vs. Till
|
|align=center|1
|align=center|3:33
|Liverpool, England
|-
|-
|Loss
|align=center|13–3
|Elias Theodorou
|Decision (unanimous)
|UFC Fight Night: Werdum vs. Tybura
|
|align=center|3
|align=center|5:00
|Sydney, Australia
|
|-
|Loss
|align=center|13–2
|Derek Brunson
|KO (punches)
|UFC Fight Night: Lewis vs. Hunt
|
|align=center|1
|align=center|1:16
|Auckland, New Zealand
|
|-
|Win
|align=center|13–1
|Rashad Evans
|Decision (split)
|UFC 209
|
|align=center|3
|align=center|5:00
|Las Vegas, Nevada, United States
|
|-
|Win
|align=center|12–1
|Chris Camozzi
|Decision (unanimous)
|UFC Fight Night: Whittaker vs. Brunson
|
|align=center|3 
|align=center|5:00
|Melbourne, Australia
| 
|-
|Win
|align=center|11–1
|Antônio Carlos Júnior
|TKO (punches)
|UFC Fight Night: Hunt vs. Mir
|
|align=center|3
|align=center|1:36
|Brisbane, Australia
| 
|-
|Win
|align=center|10–1
|Steve Montgomery
|Decision (unanimous)
|UFC 193
|
|align=center|3
|align=center|5:00
|Melbourne, Australia
|
|-
|Loss
|align=center|9–1
|Sam Alvey
|TKO (punches)
|UFC Fight Night: Miocic vs. Hunt
|
|align=center|1
|align=center|0:49
|Adelaide, Australia
|
|-
|Win
|align=center|9–0
|Patrick Walsh
|Decision (unanimous)
|UFC Fight Night: Henderson vs. Thatch
|
|align=center|3
|align=center|5:00
|Broomfield, Colorado, United States
|
|-
|Win
|align=center|8–0
|Luke Zachrich
|Submission (kimura)
|UFC Fight Night: Rockhold vs. Bisping
|
|align=center|1
|align=center|4:27
|Sydney, Australia
|
|-
|Win
|align=center|7–0
||Ben Kelleher
|Submission (rear-naked choke) 
|Australian Fighting Championship 9
|
|align=center|2
|align=center|3:41
|Albury, Australia
|
|-
|Win
|align=center|6–0
|Bor Bratovž 
|KO (punch)
|Australian Fighting Championship 6
|
|align=center|2
|align=center|1:42
|Melbourne, Australia
|
|-
|Win
|align=center|5–0
|Daniel Way
|Submission (armbar) 
|Shamrock Events: NOM 7
|
|align=center|1
|align=center|
|Melbourne, Australia
|
|-
|Win
|align=center|4–0
|Chris Birch	
|Submission (rear naked choke)
|Australian Fighting Championship 5
|
|align=center|1
|align=center|3:36
|Melbourne, Australia
|
|-
|Win
|align=center|3–0
|Kym Robinson
|Submission (rear naked choke)
|MMA Down Under 3
|
|align=center|1
|align=center|1:17
|Findon, Australia
|
|-
|Win
|align=center|2–0
|Fabio Galeb
|Decision (unanimous)
|Australian Fighting Championship 4
|
|align=center|3
|align=center|5:00
|Melbourne, Australia
|
|-
|Win
|align=center|1–0
|Ross Dallow
|TKO (thrown from the ring)
|Dojo KO - Second Elimination
|
|align=center|2
|align=center|N/A
|Melbourne, Australia
|

Mixed martial arts exhibition record

| Loss
|align=center| 0–1
|  Sheldon Westcott
| Submission (arm-triangle choke)
| The Ultimate Fighter Nations: Canada vs. Australia
|  (airdate)
|align=center| 1
|align=center| 0:56
| Quebec City, Quebec, Canada
|

See also
 List of male mixed martial artists

References

External links
 

1977 births
Living people
Sportspeople from Melbourne
Sportsmen from Victoria (Australia)
Australian male judoka
Olympic judoka of Australia
Australian practitioners of Brazilian jiu-jitsu
People awarded a black belt in Brazilian jiu-jitsu
Judoka at the 2000 Summer Olympics
Judoka at the 2004 Summer Olympics
Judoka at the 2008 Summer Olympics
Judoka at the 2012 Summer Olympics
Australian male mixed martial artists
Middleweight mixed martial artists
Mixed martial artists utilizing judo
Ultimate Fighting Championship male fighters
Mixed martial artists utilizing Brazilian jiu-jitsu